Mir Haibat Khan Tanoli was the Maternal cousin of Suba Khan Tanoli who support Suba Khan Tanoli in Third Battle of Panipat and he also fought against the Hindu Jats and Sikh.  He was belong to Hindal Khan Tanoli section who was the brother of Pallal khan Tanoli where Suba Khan Tanoli belong after the death of Suba Khan Tanoli he become the ruler and chief of Tanawal which created so much problem between the two brother hood Hindal and Pallal section. One of the son of Haibat khan, Hashim khan Tanoli was also killed by the son of Suba khan tanoli.

References

1740 births
1798 deaths